Kultayevo is a rural locality (a selo) and the administrative center of Kultayevskoye Rural Settlement, Permsky District, Perm Krai, Russia. The population was 5,067 as of 2010. There are 198 streets.

Geography 
Kultayevo is located 26 km southwest of Perm (the district's administrative centre) by road. Anikino is the nearest rural locality.

References 

Rural localities in Permsky District